Clerval may refer to:

Places 
 Clerval, Doubs, France
 Clerval, Quebec, Canada

People and fictional characters 

 Henry Clerval, a character in Frankenstein